The Archdiocese of Oklahoma City is a Latin Church ecclesiastical territory or archdiocese of the Catholic Church in the South Central region of the United States. Its ecclesiastical territory includes 46 counties in western Oklahoma, with its cathedral in Oklahoma City. The Most Reverend Paul Stagg Coakley is the current archbishop. As such, he is the metropolitan of the ecclesiastical province which includes the Archdiocese of Oklahoma City, the Diocese of Tulsa and the Diocese of Little Rock. Previously the bishop of the Diocese of Salina in Kansas, Archbishop Coakley was appointed to Oklahoma City on December 16, 2010 and installed as archbishop on February 11, 2011.

History
The diocese had its roots through French Benedictine monks who entered Indian Territory (the territory of the present state of Oklahoma), then under the jurisdiction of the Diocese of Little Rock in 1875, establishing a Catholic presence.

On 14 May 1876, Pope Pius IX erected the Apostolic Prefecture of Indian Territory, taking Indian Territory from the Diocese of Little Rock.

On 29 May 1891, Pope Leo XIII elevated this apostolic prefecture to the Apostolic Vicariate of Indian Territory.

On 23 August 1905, Pope Pius X erected the Diocese of Oklahoma, suppressing the apostolic vicariate., appointing Belgian Theophile Meerschaert as its first bishop and designating St. Joseph's Church in downtown Oklahoma City as its cathedral

On 14 November 1930, Pope Pius XI changed the title of the diocese to Diocese of Oklahoma City-Tulsa, establishing a second see.  This reflected population trends in Oklahoma.

In 1931, the Church of Our Lady of Perpetual Help was designated as the new cathedral for the diocese.

In 1949, the archdiocese established the National Shrine of the Infant Jesus of Prague at St. Wenceslaus Parish in Prague, Oklahoma.

On December 13, 1972, Pope Paul VI erected the Diocese of Tulsa, taking the territory of eastern Oklahoma from the Diocese of Oklahoma City-Tulsa.  He simultaneously elevated the existing diocese to a metropolitan archdiocese, changed its title to Archdiocese of Oklahoma City, and assigned the Diocese of Little Rock and the new Diocese of Tulsa as its suffragans.  This action established both the present territory of the Archdiocese of Oklahoma City and the present configuration of the Metropolitan Province of Oklahoma City.

On September 23, 2017, Father Stanley Francis Rother (March 27, 1935 – July 28, 1981), a priest of the Archdiocese, was beatified during a Mass at the Cox Convention Center in Oklahoma City. He had been murdered while working in Guatemala in 1981. Pope Francis had declared him a martyr, saying he had been killed "in odium fidei" (in hatred of the faith).

Bishops

Apostolic Prefects of Indian Territory
 Isidore Robot, OSB (1876–1887)
 Ignatius Jean, OSB (1887–1890)

Apostolic Vicar of Indian Territory
 Theophile Meerschaert (1891–1905), appointed Bishop of Oklahoma

Bishops of Oklahoma
 Theophile Meerschaert (1905–1924)
 Francis Kelley (1924–1930), title changed with title of diocese

Bishops of Oklahoma City-Tulsa
 Francis Kelley (1930–1948)
 Eugene J. McGuinness (1948–1957; coadjutor bishop 1944-1948)
 Victor Reed (1958–1971)
 John R. Quinn (1971–1972), elevated to archbishop and title changed with title of diocese

Archbishops of Oklahoma City
 John R. Quinn (1972–1977), appointed Archbishop of San Francisco
 Charles Salatka (1977–1992)
 Eusebius J. Beltran (1993–2010)
 Paul Stagg Coakley (2011–present)

Other priests of this diocese who became bishops
Stephen Aloysius Leven, appointed auxiliary bishop of San Antonio in 1955
Charles Albert Buswell, appointed Bishop of Pueblo in 1959
John Joseph Sullivan, appointed Bishop of Grand Island in 1972
Anthony Basil Taylor, appointed Bishop of Little Rock in 2008
Edward Joseph Weisenburger, appointed Bishop of Salina in 2012

Newspaper
The official news and information publication of the diocese is the Sooner Catholic.

High schools
 Bishop McGuinness High School, Oklahoma City
 Cristo Rey Catholic High School, Oklahoma City
 Mount St. Mary High School, Oklahoma City

Universities
St. Gregory's University, Shawnee [now closed]

Summer camps
Our Lady of Guadalupe Summer Camp, in between Luther and Wellston

Ecclesiastical province

See: List of the Catholic bishops of the United States

See also

 Catholic Church by country
 Catholic Church in the United States
 Ecclesiastical Province of Oklahoma City
 Global organisation of the Catholic Church
 List of Roman Catholic archdioceses (by country and continent)
 List of Roman Catholic dioceses (alphabetical) (including archdioceses)
 List of Roman Catholic dioceses (structured view) (including archdioceses)
 List of the Catholic dioceses of the United States

Sources

External links

Roman Catholic Archdiocese of Oklahoma City Official Site
Sooner Catholic Online website
St. Gregory's University  official website

 
Roman Catholic Ecclesiastical Province of Oklahoma City
Archdiocese of Oklahoma City
Education in Oklahoma City
Culture of Oklahoma City
Oklahoma City
Oklahoma
Roman Catholic Archdiocese of Oklahoma City
1905 establishments in Oklahoma Territory